Dr. Jessica L. Benham (born December 13, 1990) is an American politician and disability rights activist serving as a member of the Pennsylvania House of Representatives for the 36th District. She is the first openly LGBTQ+ woman and first openly autistic person elected to the Pennsylvania General Assembly. Benham is one of the only autistic state lawmakers in the United States. She cofounded the Pittsburgh Center for Autistic Advocacy in 2014.

Education 
Benham completed a bachelor's degree in political science and communication at Bethel University. She earned a master's degree in communication at Minnesota State University, Mankato and a master's degree in bioethics at University of Pittsburgh (Pitt). While at Pitt, she was a member of the organizing committee to start a union for graduate students. Benham holds a doctorate in communication from the University of Pittsburgh, which she completed while serving as a state representative.

Career 
In 2014, Benham cofounded the Pittsburgh Center for Autistic Advocacy where she served as the director of development. It is an LGBTQ+ autistic-led advocacy group, and the only LGBTQ+ Autistic led advocacy program in the Greater Pittsburgh Region. The group successfully advocates for state legislation including Paul's Law which prohibited those with disabilities from being denied organ transplants.

Jessica advocates for Autistic rights, creates Sensory friendly spaces, increases access to Individual Education and 504 plans for autistic children in the public schooling system. She helps educators, parents, and healthcare workers to better understand those with autism, and reduces roadblocks to employment for autistic adults.

Through the PCAA and other mediums, Jessica has worked to ensure the fair treatment of individuals with disabilities in the legislative system. She has consulted and provided feedback for the Pittsburgh City Council's recent gun legislation, state level healthcare efforts, and the endeavor to create autism designations on driver's licenses, and licenses plates.

Being a graduate from the University of Pittsburgh, Jessica is involved in the organization of a graduate student union. Here, she facilitates meetings, phone banking, and serves as the editor-in-chief of the committee newsletter.

Since 2016, she has been active in the Zone 3 Public Safety Council of District 36.

In 2020, Benham defeated opponent AJ Doyle and was elected to the Pennsylvania House of Representatives for the 36th District where she succeeded Harry Readshaw. She is the first LGBTQ+ woman and first autistic person elected to the Pennsylvania General Assembly. Her campaign focused on healthcare, workers' rights, and a clean environment. Benham received endorsements from local trades labor unions including in the natural-gas industry.

She has served as the Judge of Elections since 2018.

Committee assignments 

 Aging & Older Adult Services
 Health
 Human Services

Personal life 
Benham is autistic and bisexual. She has a cat, Ravi.

References

External links
 

Living people
Place of birth missing (living people)
Bethel University (Minnesota) alumni
Minnesota State University, Mankato alumni
University of Pittsburgh alumni
21st-century American women politicians
Bisexual women
LGBT state legislators in Pennsylvania
Bisexual politicians
People on the autism spectrum
Women state legislators in Pennsylvania
Democratic Party members of the Pennsylvania House of Representatives
Autism activists
American disability rights activists
Activists from Pennsylvania
21st-century American politicians
1990 births
Bioethicists